Founded in 2003, Clear Stage Cincinnati is a professional theatre company in Cincinnati, Ohio, United States, dedicated to developing and showcasing fresh new theatrical artists by providing them with a "Clear Stage" for the advancement of their craft.

Theatre companies in Cincinnati
Theatres in Cincinnati
Entertainment companies established in 2003